Love Nest is a 1951 American comedy-drama film directed by Joseph Newman, and starring June Haver, William Lundigan, Frank Fay and Marilyn Monroe.

The post-World War II comedy features an early supporting role for Monroe. It is one of the few films future Tonight Show host Jack Paar made prior to his television career, and the last film appearance by Fay, who had been a popular stage comedian in the 1920s and revived his career starring in the long-running Broadway comedy Harvey. It was also the last appearance by silent star Leatrice Joy.

The film borrows its name from the song "Love Nest" with music by Louis Hirsch and lyrics by Otto A. Harbach. The song is sung by a chorus over the opening credits and was used as a theme song for The Burns and Allen Show on both radio and TV.

Plot
When serviceman and author Jim Scott (William Lundigan) returns from Paris to his hometown, New York City, he is flabbergasted to discover that his well-meaning but unrealistic wife Connie (June Haver) has invested his wages in a run-down apartment building. Despite Connie's hopes that being a landlord will give Jim time to write a novel, Jim realizes that the building will require much work and will barely give them enough income.

Meanwhile, smooth-talking Charley Patterson (Frank Fay), a confidence man who romances and swindles wealthy widows, meets his neighbor in the building, gentle widow Eadie Gaynor (Leatrice Joy), and becomes enamoured of her even though she is poor. Then, Jim persuades Connie to rent the vacant apartment to his old Army buddy Bobbie. When Bobbie arrives, Connie is shocked to see that she is a stunning former WAC named Roberta Stevens (Marilyn Monroe).

An FBI agent visits and asks the Scotts what they know about Mr. Patterson, implying that he is under investigation. Later, an inspector from the Department of Housing and Building informs the Scotts that the exposed wiring in their building is a serious code violation, and that if it is not fixed within fifteen days, the building will be condemned. That night, Charley and Eadie announce their engagement, worrying Connie. Charley and Eadie leave the next day to be married, after which Jim learns that it will be so expensive to fix the wiring that he must sell the building.

Jim and Connie have received no offers by the time Charley and Eadie return, and Charley lends Jim the $800 needed for the repairs. Jim still wants to sell, however, as he is convinced that the building will drive them deeper into debt. Connie and Jim argue about the building and Bobbie, of whom Connie is still jealous, and Jim storms out of their apartment to sleep in a hammock in the back yard. Jim ends up sleeping in Bobbie's empty apartment, as he knows that she is away on a modeling assignment, but the next morning, Bobbie returns home, and Connie mistakenly assumes that she and Jim have spent the night together. Connie's anger is deflected by a newspaper story concerning Mrs. Frazier, a woman she and Jim saw in a nightclub with Charley, who has been cheated by an "elderly Casanova" named Charley Price. Charley assures them that he truly loves Eadie and has now retired. Charley decides to leave and send for Eadie later, but the police arrive before he can escape. As he is being taken away, Charley reassures Eadie that she is the only woman he has ever loved.

Charley, who insists on paying for his crimes by pleading guilty, arranges for Jim to get arrested for receiving the $800 from him, as it was part of the money he took from Mrs. Frazier. Jim is infuriated when he is thrown in a cell with Charley, but the older man explains that he needed time to tell Jim his life story so that he can write a book about him. Jim is released the next day and writes Charley's book, which becomes a best-seller.

After eighteen months, Charley is released from prison and reunites with Eadie. Later, Jim and Connie, who have beautified the apartment building with Jim's royalties, watch with amusement as Eadie and Charley take their newly born twin daughters for a walk.

Cast 
 June Haver as Connie Scott
 William Lundigan as Jim Scott
 Frank Fay as Charley Patterson
 Marilyn Monroe as Roberta Stevens
 Jack Paar as Ed Forbes
 Leatrice Joy as Eadie Gaynor
 Henry Kulky as George Thompson

Critical response

Variety said: 
There are only a few fresh lines and situations in the script, and they are not enough to add any punch to a rather "dated" theme, no matter how hard the cast toppers try to keep the laughs going. ... Marilyn Monroe is tossed in to cause jealousy between the landlords... The Jules Buck production supervision is adequate for physical polish, but short on story and script guidance.

Film Daily said: 
Lightly skipping about in its treatment of G.I.'s postwar investment, engineered by his wife while he was overseas, in a rundown house in the Gramercy Park section of Manhattan, Love Nest is a mild variety of comedy which gets a considerable boost from the expert talents—in that line—of Frank Fay. Rarely seen, he registers here as a smoothie, glib and ultra sophisticated, handy with the correct word on the correct occasion. Leatrice Joy is also present in this number. She gives mature warmth to the proceedings. Marilyn Monroe has that other quality, while William Lundigan, an author, and June Haver play at being married and troubled with their creaky domicile.

References

External links 
 
 
 
 
 
 Theatrical release poster

1951 films
1951 comedy-drama films
20th Century Fox films
American black-and-white films
American comedy-drama films
1950s English-language films
Films based on American novels
Films directed by Joseph M. Newman
Films scored by Cyril J. Mockridge
Films set in New York City
Films with screenplays by I. A. L. Diamond
1950s American films